Gooi Hsiao Leung (born 28 December 1972) is a Malaysian politician who has served as Member of the Penang State Legislative Assembly (MLA) for Bukit Tengah since May 2018. He also served as Member of Parliament (MP) for Alor Setar from May 2013 to May 2018. He is a member of the People's Justice Party (PKR), a component party of the Penang state ruling but federal opposition Pakatan Harapan (PH) and formerly Pakatan Rakyat (PR) coalitions.

Gooi's passion for Malaysian politics has been life-long. From a young age he followed his father, Gooi Hock Seng, former DAP Member of Parliament and State Assemblyman, through multiple election campaigns in the 80s and 90s. This instilled in Gooi his strong desire for change, equality, good governance and a true democracy in Malaysia through a robust Opposition.

Before his political career, Gooi pursued his passion for human rights defending clients both locally and overseas, where he worked for the United Nations at the Special Panels and Serious Crimes Unit in East Timor.

A lawyer by profession, Gooi contested the Alor Setar parliamentary seat at the 2008 general election, but lost to the seat's long-serving incumbent, Chor Chee Heung of the Malaysian Chinese Association (MCA), by 184 votes. He recontested the seat in the 2013 general election. Amid a nationwide swing away from Barisan Nasional coalition parties, such as the MCA, in urban areas, Gooi unseated Chor by 1,873 votes.

In the 2018 general election, Gooi contested for the Bukit Tengah state seat of the Penang State Legislative Assembly instead and won it in a five-corner fight.

Election results

References

Living people
1972 births
People from Penang
20th-century Malaysian lawyers
People's Justice Party (Malaysia) politicians
Malaysian politicians of Chinese descent
Members of the Dewan Rakyat
Members of the Penang State Legislative Assembly
21st-century Malaysian lawyers